Harriet Sundström, ( 23December 1872 – 28April 1961) was a Swedish landscape artist.

Biography
She was the younger daughter of Carl Rudolf Sundström (1841-1889) and Carolina Sofia Häggström (1849–1943) both of whom were  educators.
Her father was an ornithologist and doctor of zoology. Her mother was a journalist and foreign editor with  Stockholms-Tidningen. She was the sister of Ellen Ammann (1870–1932) who became a co-founder of the German Catholic Women's Association.

Sundström studied at Tekniska Skolan in Stockholm, in Paris at Académie Colarossi with artists Franz Roubaud and Heinrich von Zügel and with Charles Tooby in Munich. She was also a student for artist Anders Zorn. 

She was part of the art-group "De Frie" and also created the organisation Originalträsnitt in 1911. She was vice president of the Grafiska Sällskapet in 1928 to 1937.Her art is on display at Nationalmuseum, Moderna Museet, Zornmuseet, at museums in Malmö and Norrköping and also at Konstakademien. Harriet Sundström died in Stockholm in 1961. Harriet's work was always signed with  "HS" or "H.Sundström".

References

Further reading 

1872 births
1961 deaths
Swedish women artists
20th-century Swedish painters
Swedish printmakers
Artists from Stockholm
Swedish women sculptors
Swedish sculptors
Swedish women painters
Swedish painters
Women printmakers
20th-century sculptors
20th-century Swedish women artists
20th-century Swedish artists
20th-century printmakers